Aboriginal Housing Victoria (AHV) is a not-for-profit, registered community housing agency and is the largest Aboriginal housing organisation in the Australian state of Victoria. AHV was the first Aboriginal housing agency to be registered as a housing provider in Victoria and it is also the largest in Australia, and serves as an Aboriginal landlord, providing personalised, culturally sensitive services for over 4000 Aboriginal Victorians through more than 1500 tenancies.

History 
Until the 1951s no government housing was provided for Aboriginal people in Victoria and much of what began to be provided was inadequate, and delivered under an assimilation policy that saw the dislocation of Aboriginal people from traditional lands into accommodation that was often unfit for habitation.

More concerted efforts from the Commonwealth Government in the 1970s saw a major allocation of funds for Aboriginal housing and the establishment of Aboriginal housing organisations. However the major responsibility for Aboriginal controlled housing was transferred to the states, against the wishes of the Aboriginal housing organisations (known as cooperatives in Victoria).

The Aboriginal men and women involved in housing identified a need for a self-managed Aboriginal housing organisation, given continuing frustration with the quality of housing and treatment of Aboriginal tenants in private and social housing.  By the late 1970s, the movement for an Aboriginal controlled housing organisation in Victoria had gained momentum, at a time when Aboriginal community leaders across Australia set up their own organisations to address inadequate provision of services such as housing, health, childcare, community services, education and legal services.

At the heart of this movement was the importance of gaining back control  – Aboriginal owned and administered housing, and not just the provision of accommodation. "All houses transferred to the Housing Commission from the Ministry of Aboriginal Affairs should be handed over to the Aboriginal Co-operatives for the purpose of housing Aboriginal people."  – Nessie Skuta, National Aboriginal Conference representative for country Victoria, 1978.It is clear that transfer of housing to Aboriginal organisations was seen by Victoria's Aboriginal community leaders as being about handing back the control that had been removed, about righting a previous wrong.

By 1981, the Aboriginal Housing Board of Victoria was established to oversee the management of properties owned by the Victorian Government for the provision of housing to Victorian Aboriginal people.  Originating as a small community organisation representing Victorian Aboriginal communities, a partnership was formed with the Victorian Government as members advocated for the allocation of accessible and appropriate housing for Aboriginal Victorians and for the better treatment of Aboriginal tenants.

The establishment of the AHBV was the culmination of more than two decades of efforts from Victorian Aboriginal community leaders and a major achievement in taking back control and self-management of Aboriginal lives in Victoria. The founding members of the board had a vision that it would one day own the properties it managed, and this has been a driving force for the organisation.

In 2016, the Victorian Government announced it would transfer 1,522 property titles worth  to AHV over a two-year period.

Today
Aboriginal Housing Victoria continues to provide culturally sensitive, Aboriginal service delivery as it works towards the goal of self-determination through Aboriginal owned title.

Vision
"Our vision is that Aboriginal Victorians are able to secure appropriate, affordable housing as a pathway to better lives and stronger communities."

Services 
AHV provides housing to approximately 4,000 low income Aboriginal and Torres Strait Islander Victorians, representing at least 8% of the Victorian Aboriginal population, in 1,525 properties across metropolitan and regional Victoria.  The majority of the properties are owned by the Department of Health and Human Services.

Aboriginal and Torres Strait Islander people in need of housing can make an application to AHV, and they will be placed on a waiting list until a suitable home in a preferred area becomes available.  Applicants may be considered for priority housing if they are deemed to have a more urgent need than general applicants.

Tenants pay subsidised rent to AHV, who manages the properties including maintenance and repairs. AHV achieves above community housing sector standard for maintaining tenancies – 89% in 2014–15.

While provision of housing is core business, the organisation works closely with other Aboriginal service providers to support the needs of its tenants who can have unique and complex disadvantage.

The organisation believes this success is rooted in the notion that Aboriginal owned and controlled organisations are best placed to provide services for Aboriginal people, without interference or patronage from non-Aboriginal organisations or bureaucracies.

But AHV is also a multicultural organisation and sees its strength in the diversity of its people – both Indigenous and non-Indigenous – "working together with mutual respect and co-operation, expertise and knowledge" – Jim Berg, "More Bees With Honey –A History of the Aboriginal Housing Board of Victoria.”

Governance 

Aboriginal Housing Victoria is: 
 A company limited by guarantee and established under the Corporations Act 2001 (Cth);
 A registered housing agency under the Housing Act 1983 (Vic); and
 A registered charity under the Australian Charities and Not-for-profits Commission Act 2012 (Cth) and a public benevolent institution, entitled to tax concessions under the Income Tax Assessment Act 1997 (Cth)
AHV is governed by a board composed of non-executive directors. The chairperson is elected by the full board. In accordance with the AHV constitution, there are no less than 5 and no more than 7 directors on the board, and the majority must be Aboriginal.

Directors hold office for a term commencing on the date from which he or she is appointed and concluding at the expiry of the third annual general meeting of the company following appointment.

All directors must live in Victoria and a majority must be Aboriginal.

Key officeholders 
, key officeholders are:
Chair – Tim Chatfield
Deputy Chair – Ian Hamm
CEO – Darren Smith

Timeline

More Bees With Honey: A History of the Aboriginal Housing Board of Victoria 1981 – 2004

Appendix 1A – Additional History Timeline 2004 – ongoing 

September 2017 – In a significant step toward self-determination, the Victorian Government announces transfer of ownership of over 500 metropolitan houses to AHV, with non-metropolitan houses to be transferred in two tranches over the following two years. This realises AHV's long held aspiration to own the rental properties it manages on behalf of Government and lays the foundation for future growth.

References

External links

Non-profit organisations based in Victoria (Australia)
Australian Aboriginal cultural history
Organisations serving Indigenous Australians
1981 establishments in Australia
Indigenous Australians in Victoria (Australia)